The Scala Theatre was a theatre in Charlotte Street, London, off Tottenham Court Road. The first theatre on the site opened in 1772, and the theatre was demolished in 1969, after being destroyed by fire.  From 1865 to 1882, the theatre was known as the Prince of Wales's Theatre (not to be confused with Prince of Wales Theatre).

Origins
The theatre began on this site as The New Rooms where concerts were performed, in Charlotte Street, in 1772, under the management of Francis Pasquali. Popularity, and royal patronage led to the building's enlargement by James Wyatt, and its renaming as the King's Concert Rooms (1780–1786). It then became Rooms for Concerts of Ancient Music and Hyde's Rooms (1786–1802, managed by The Directors of Concerts and Ancient Music).

In 1802, a private theatre club managed by Captain Caulfield, the "Pic-Nics", occupied the building and named it the Cognoscenti Theatre (1802–1808). It became the New Theatre (1808–1815) and was extended and fitted out as a public theatre, with a portico entrance on Tottenham Street. It opened on 23 April 1810 with Love in a Village.

It continued under a succession of managers as the unsuccessful Regency Theatre (1815–1820), falling into decline. The theatre then reopened as the West London Theatre (1820–1831), Queen's Theatre (1831–1833, 1835–1837, and 1839–1865), and Fitzroy Theatre (1833–1835). The lessee of the theatre from 1839 to 1865 was a scenic artist, Charles James James, and the theatre became the home of lurid melodrama, being nicknamed The Dusthole.

Prince of Wales's Royal Theatre 1865–1882
In 1865, the theatre was renovated and named the Prince of Wales's Royal Theatre and this continued until it went dark in 1882. It was demolished in 1903. In 1865, in partnership with Henry Byron, Marie Wilton assumed the management of the theatre, having secured as a leading actor Squire Bancroft.  He starred in J. P. Wooler's A Winning Hazard, among other works.  Wilton provided the capital, and Byron wrote a number of plays.  His first was a burlesque of La sonnambula.  However, Wilton wanted to present more sophisticated pieces. She agreed to produce three more burlesques by Byron, while he agreed to write his first prose comedies, War to the Knife (a success in 1865) and A Hundred Thousand Pounds (1866).  By 1867, Byron left the partnership.

The house soon became noted for the successful domestic drama-comedies by Thomas William Robertson, including his series of groundbreaking realist plays, Society (1865), Ours (1866), Caste (1867), Play (1868), School (1869), and M.P. (1870). In 1867, Wilton married Squire Bancroft and took his surname as Mrs. Effie Bancroft and regularly took the principal female parts in these pieces opposite her husband.  Other plays were W. S. Gilbert's Allow Me To Explain (1867; this ran as a companion piece to Robertson's Caste) and Sweethearts (1874), as well as Tame Cats (1868), Lytton's Money (1872), The School for Scandal (1874), a revival of Boucicault's London Assurance (1877), and Diplomacy (Clement Scott's 1878 adaptation of Sardou's Dora).  A number of prominent actors played at the theatre during this period, among them John Hare, Charles Coghlan, the Kendals, and Ellen Terry.

A big success in 1881 was F. C. Burnand's The Colonel, which went on to run for 550 performances, transferring to the Imperial Theatre.  In 1882, the theatre went dark, and from 1886 the theatre buildings were used as a Salvation Army Hostel, until it was demolished in 1903. Another theatre near Leicester Square, London, began to use the name Prince of Wales Theatre in 1886.

Scala Theatre 1905–1969 
In 1903, Dr. Edmund Distin Maddick bought the property, and adjoining properties, and enlarged the site. The main entrance was now in Charlotte Street, and the old portico in Tottenham Street became the stage door. The new theatre, designed by Frank Verity, opened in 1905, as The Scala Theatre, seating 1,139 and boasting a large stage. The new venture was not particularly successful and became a cinema, from 1911 to 1918, run by Charles Urban. In 1918, F. J. Nettlefold took over and ran the premises as a theatre again.

It became known as the New Scala in 1923, with D. A. Abrahams as licensee for staging plays and showing films; he became owner in 1925. Amateur productions and pantomimes were performed, and for a while the theatre became home to the Gang Show.  During World War II, it again housed professional theatre, reverting to the Scala Theatre. After the war, under the management of Prince Littler, amateur productions returned, with Peter Pan being the annual pantomime. This continued until 1969 when, after a fire, it was demolished for the building of offices, known as Scala House (25 Tottenham Street). In 1964, the theatre was used by The Beatles for the concert sequences in the film A Hard Day's Night.

Cinema (1976–1980) 
The Other Cinema opened in October 1976 in the basement of Scala House; it showed avant-garde films and closed in February 1977. The premises reopened as Scala Cinema in June 1978. It showed a daily programme of films. In 1980, the Scala House was taken over by Channel 4 television, and in 1981 the former Odeon King’s Cross cinema in Pentonville Road was renamed Scala Cinema.

References

Further reading
Baker, Henry Barton. History of the London stage and its famous players (1576-1903). London: Routledge, 1904.
Howard, Diana. London Theatres and Music Halls 1850-1950. London: The Library Association, 1970.
Leacroft, Richard. The Development of the English Playhouse. Ithaca: Cornell University Press, 1976.
Mander, Raymond & Mitchenson, Joe. The Lost Theatres of London. New York: Taplinger Publishing Company: 1968.
Mander, Raymond & Mitchenson, Joe. The Theatres of London. London: Harvest, 1963

External links
University of Kent, History of Scala Theatre accessed 12 Mar 2007
Photos and historical information about the theatre accessed 12 Mar 2007
University of Kent, Theatre Collection accessed 12 Mar 2007
University of Massachusetts, Theatre chronology accessed 12 Mar 2007

Theatres completed in 1772
1905 establishments in England
1969 disestablishments
Former theatres in London
Former buildings and structures in the London Borough of Camden
Fitzrovia